Have Mercy may refer to:

 Have Mercy (album), an album by The Mooney Suzuki
 "Have Mercy" (Chlöe song), a song by Chlöe
 "Have Mercy" (The Judds song), a song by The Judds
 "Have Mercy" (YBN Cordae song), a song by YBN Cordae
 "Have Mercy", an alternate title of "Mercy, Mercy" (Don Covay song)
 "Have Mercy", a song by Loretta Lynn from her 2004 album, Van Lear Rose
 "Have Mercy", a song by Thunder from their 2008 album, Bang!
 "Have Mercy", a catchphrase by Jesse Katsopolis on Full House
 Have Mercy: His Complete Chess Recordings, 1969-1974, an album by Chuck Berry
 Have Mercy, an album by Robert Ducat
 Have Mercy, a 2009 mixtape by Curtis Santiago
 Have Mercy, a 1995 autobiography by Wolfman Jack
 Have Mercy (band), a rock band from Baltimore, Maryland

See also 
 
 Lord Have Mercy (disambiguation)
 Mercy (disambiguation)